Karan Singh Tanwar is a leader of Bharatiya Janata Party and a former member of the Delhi Legislative Assembly. He was jailed during The Emergency in 1975–77 for 19 months. He was a Vice Chairman of NDMC.

References

Members of the Delhi Legislative Assembly
Living people
Indians imprisoned during the Emergency (India)
Year of birth missing (living people)
Place of birth missing (living people)